Myllocerus dentifer, is a species of weevil found in India, Pakistan and Sri Lanka.

Description
Body blackish in color with brownish spots.

Biology
Adult beetles is a major pest on Ziziphus mauritiana that feed on leaves. Infestation visible with notching on the leaf margins due to extensive feeding along the leaf veins. Adults lay their eggs in the soil.

References 

Curculionidae
Insects of Sri Lanka
Beetles described in 1792